Green Isle is a city in Sibley County, Minnesota, United States. The population was 522 at the 2020 census.

History
The Minneapolis and St. Louis Railway (M&StL) originally built the railroad tracks between Norwood and Morton circa 1880. Green Isle was platted in 1881, incorporating these northeast/southwest-oriented tracks. The town was named after the preexisting township, a name allusive of Ireland, the Emerald Isle, as many of its earliest settlers were from Ireland.

Geography
Minnesota State Highways 5 and 25 are two of the main routes in the community.

Demographics

2010 census
As of the census of 2010, there were 559 people, 218 households, and 154 families residing in the city. The racial makeup of the city was 98.2% White, 0.4% African American, 0.2% Native American, 0.9% from other races, and 0.4% from two or more races. Hispanic or Latino of any race were 3.0% of the population.

There were 218 households, of which 39.9% had children under 18 living with them, 51.8% were married couples living together, 11.5% had a female householder with no husband present, 7.3% had a male householder with no wife present, and 29.4% were non-families. 22.9% of all households were made up of individuals, and 6.4% had someone living alone who 65 or older. The average household size was 2.56 and the average family size was 2.98.

The median age in the city was 32.1. 30.2% of residents were under 18; 5.1% were between 18 and 24; 36.9% were from 25 to 44; 16% were from 45 to 64; and 12% were 65 or older. The gender makeup of the city was 48.8% male and 51.2% female.

2000 census
As of the census of 2000, there were 334 people, 136 households, and 102 families residing in the city. The racial makeup of the city was 98.50% White, 0.30% African American, 0.90% Asian, 0.30% from other races. Hispanic or Latino of any race were 3.59% of the population.

There were 136 households, of which 33.1% had children under 18 living with them, 65.4% were married couples living together, 5.9% had a female householder with no husband present, and 25.0% were non-families. 22.8% of all households were made up of individuals, and 11.0% had someone living alone who was 65 or older. The average household size was 2.46 and the average family size was 2.89.

In the city, the population was spread out, with 24.9% under 18, 7.5% from 18 to 24, 32.6% from 25 to 44, 18.3% from 45 to 64, and 16.8% who were 65 or older. The median age was 36. For every 100 females, there were 108.8 males. For every 100 females 18 and over, there were 110.9 males.

The median income for a household in the city was $44,792, and the median income for a family was $51,964. Males had a median income of $31,979 versus $25,625 for females. The per capita income was $25,537. About 1.8% of families and 2.5% of the population were below the poverty line, including none of those under 18 and 11.8% of those 65 or over.

Notable person
 Ann Tracy, American visual artist

References

External links
City of Green Isle
City-Data.com

Cities in Minnesota
Cities in Sibley County, Minnesota
1881 establishments in Minnesota